Every Last Drop is a 2008 pulp-noir/horror novel  by American writer Charlie Huston. It is the fourth novel in the Joe Pitt Casebooks, following Half the Blood of Brooklyn. The series follows the life of the New York vampyre Joe Pitt, who works sometimes as an enforcer for various vampyre factions in New York and sometimes as a sort of detective.

Plot summary

Characters

This book introduces a number of new characters to the series, including Esperanza Lucretia Benjamin, the vampyre nominally in charge of Queens.

External links

 Author Charlie Huston's Official Website and Blog

2000s horror novels
2008 American novels
Contemporary fantasy novels
American horror novels
American thriller novels
American vampire novels
Novels set in New York City
Del Rey books